Cándido Morales (born 1915) is a Cuban former third baseman who played in the Negro leagues in the 1940s.

A native of Cuba, Morales played for the Memphis Red Sox in 1948. In three recorded games, he posted five hits in 12 plate appearances.

References

External links
 and Seamheads

1915 births
Date of birth missing
Place of birth missing
Memphis Red Sox players
Baseball third basemen
Possibly living people
Cuban expatriate baseball players in the United States